Jeannie Epper (born January 27, 1941) is an American stuntwoman and actress. She has performed stunts in over 100 feature films and television series and is perhaps best known as Lynda Carter's stunt double on the 1970s television series Wonder Woman. She was featured in Amanda Micheli's 2004 documentary Double Dare, along with New Zealand stuntwoman and actress Zoë Bell. Entertainment Weekly noted that many consider her "the greatest stuntwoman who's ever lived."

Her acting roles have included appearances in The Life and Times of Judge Roy Bean (1972), Foxy Brown (1974), Switchblade Sisters (1975), Drum (1976), Supernatural (2006), Beverly Hills Cop III (1994), Kill Bill: Volume 2 (2004), and Quarantine (2008).

Biography
Jean Luann "Jeannie" Epper was born in 1941 to professional stunt performers John and Frances Epper. John had immigrated to the United States from Switzerland during the 1920s. After establishing a riding academy in Los Angeles, he broke into the film industry as a stuntman specializing in horseback stunts. Jeannie Epper began learning stunt work from her father at the age of nine, and she became one of the first professional child stunt doubles. Her family traces its lineage back to "a colonel in Napoleon's army". 

Although it was initially challenging for Epper to find work, as men had traditionally done the stunt work for many actresses, the industry began to open up to more women in the 1970s, and Epper made her breakthrough with regular stunt double work for Lynda Carter in Wonder Woman (1975–1979) and Kate Jackson in Charlie's Angels (1976). Epper's subsequent stunt work included the film Romancing the Stone (1984), for which she received the 1985 Annual Stuntman Award for Most Spectacular Stunt (Feature Film). In the early 21st century, Epper performed stunts in Catch Me If You Can (2002), Minority Report (2002), and Kill Bill: Vol. 2 (2004).

Epper was a founding member of the Stuntwomen's Association of Motion Pictures in 1968, and in 1999 she served as its president. She is an honorary member of the Stuntmen's Association of Motion Pictures.

In May 2007, Epper received a lifetime achievement award from the Taurus World Stunt Awards, becoming the first woman selected for the honor. She has continued to work as a stunt performer since then, with later work including the film Hot Pursuit (2015). As of 2018, it is estimated that Epper has completed almost 150 stunts for film and television over the course of her career.

References

External links
 
Stuntwomen's Association of Motion Pictures official website

1941 births
American stunt performers
Living people